Marina Valdemarsdotter of Sweden (died after 1285) was a Swedish princess and a countess consort of  Diepholz by marriage to  Rudolf II, Count of Diepholz  (1262–1303). She was the daughter of Valdemar, King of Sweden, and Queen Sophia of Denmark. She married Count Rudolph II von Diepholz at Nyköping in Södermanland during 1285.

References 

 Lagerqvist & Åberg i Litet lexikon över Sveriges regenter  s. 18

Swedish princesses
Year of birth missing
Year of death uncertain
Place of birth missing
House of Bjelbo
13th-century Swedish people
Daughters of kings